Cordillera Occidental is Spanish for "Western mountain". It may refer to:

 Cordillera Occidental (Colombia)
 Cordillera Occidental (Ecuador)
 Cordillera Occidental (Peru)
 Cordillera Occidental (Bolivia)

See also
 Sierra Madre Occidental, the Western mountain range in Mexico
 North American Cordillera, the Western mountain range in North America
 Cordillera Central (disambiguation)
 Cordillera Oriental (disambiguation)